The episodes for the tenth season of the anime series Naruto: Shippuden are based on Part II for Masashi Kishimoto's manga series. The episodes are directed by Hayato Date, and produced by Pierrot and TV Tokyo. Released on DVD under the name , the season follows the assemblance of the Kage, the five village leaders attempting to stop Sasuke Uchiha and the remaining members of the Akatsuki. The season aired from February to July 2011.  Its first Japanese DVD volume was released by Aniplex on September 7, 2011.

The season's English dubbed version aired on Neon Alley from July 13 to December 21, 2013. The season would make its English television debut on Adult Swim's Toonami programming block and premiere from April 8 to October 6, 2018. The season's first episode ran on Adult Swim in its original Japanese audio with English subtitles on April 1, 2018, as part of an annual April Fools stunt by the network, and proceeded to play the same episode in its normal English dub format the following week.

The season contains five musical themes: two openings and three endings. The first opening theme, "Diver" by NICO Touches the Walls is used from episodes 197 to 205. The second opening theme,  by 7!! is used from episodes 206 to 221. The first ending theme,  by Aqua Timez is used from episodes 197 to 205. The second ending theme, "FREEDOM" by HOME MADE Kazoku is used from episodes 206 to 218. The third ending theme,  by OKAMOTO'S is used from episodes 219 to 221.


Episode list

Home releases

Japanese

English

Notes

References

General

 

2011 Japanese television seasons
Shippuden Season 10

Specific